The 1993 FIFA World Player of the Year award was won by Roberto Baggio. The ceremony took place at the Caesars Palace in Las Vegas, on December 19, 1993, as part of the 1994 FIFA World Cup finals draw. 71 national team coaches, based on the current FIFA Men's World Ranking were chosen to vote. It was organised by the European Sports Media, Adidas, Energizer and FIFA.

Results

References

FIFA World Player of the Year
FIFA World Player of the Year